B. Eugene Nicholson (June 14, 1941 – December 30, 2019) was a former American football coach. He served as the head football coach at the Westminster College in New Wilmington, Pennsylvania from 1991 to 1998, compiling and record of 64–25–2 and winning the NAIA Division II Football National Championship in 1994.  Nicholson began his coaching career in 1964 at Wilmington Area High School in New Wilmington as an assistant under Joe Fusco before succeeding him as head coach in 1967.  After two seasons as head coach at Wilmington, Fusco moved on to Westminster College as an assistant under Harold Burry, rejoining Fusco, who was also an assistant to Burry.  Nicholson was the head men's golf coach at Westminster for 13 seasons until his retirement in 2013. He was also the head coach of the school's swimming, tennis, wrestling, and track teams.

Nicholson was born on June 14, 1941, in Mullins, South Carolina. He spent his childhood in Fayetteville, North Carolina, Germany, and Brentwood, Pennsylvania, graduating in 1959 from Brentwood High School. Nicholson died on December 30, 2019, at Sharon Regional Medical Center in Sharon, Pennsylvania.

Head coaching record

College football

References

1941 births
2019 deaths
Slippery Rock football players
Westminster Titans football coaches
College golf coaches in the United States
College swimming coaches in the United States
College tennis coaches in the United States
College track and field coaches in the United States
College wrestling coaches in the United States
High school football coaches in Pennsylvania
People from Allegheny County, Pennsylvania
Sportspeople from Fayetteville, North Carolina
People from Mullins, South Carolina
Players of American football from Pennsylvania